Object sexuality or objectophilia is a group of paraphilias characterized by sexual or romantic attraction focused on particular inanimate objects. Individuals with this attraction may have strong feelings of love and commitment to certain items or structures of their fixation.  For some, sexual or close emotional relationships with humans are incomprehensible. Some object-sexual individuals also often believe in animism, and sense reciprocation based on the belief that objects have souls, intelligence, and feelings, and are able to communicate. Questions of its legality or ethical provenance have not arisen, given that inanimate objects are inert and are not 'harmed' through this specific paraphilia. Public sexual consummation of object sexual desires may be dealt with through public nudity or anti-exhibitionism legislation.

Research 
In 2009 Amy Marsh, a clinical sexologist, surveyed the twenty-one English-speaking members of Erika Eiffel's 40-strong OS Internationale about their experiences. About half reported autism spectrum disorders: six had been diagnosed, four were affected but not diagnosed, and three of the remaining nine reported having "some traits." According to Marsh, "The emotions and experiences reported by OS people correspond to general definitions of sexual orientation," such as that in an APA article "on sexual orientation and homosexuality ... [which] refers to sexual orientation as involving 'feelings and self-concept.'"

OS awareness and advocacy
In 2009, Erika Eiffel appeared on Good Morning America and The Tyra Banks Show with Amy Marsh to discuss her "marriage" to the Eiffel Tower and how her object love helped her become a world champion archer. Marsh shared the results of her survey and her belief that OS could be a genuine sexual orientation, and reasoned that if childhood trauma were a factor, that there would be more OS individuals. Eiffel, who  had adopted her surname after a 2007 "marriage" to the Eiffel Tower, founded OS Internationale, an educational website and international online community for those identifying or researching the condition to love objects.

Literature 
Marsh sees OS-like behavior in classic literature. In Victor Hugo's The Hunchback of Notre Dame:

In popular culture

Real life 
 In 1979 a Swedish woman married the Berlin Wall.
 In 2007 Erika Eiffel married the Eiffel Tower
 In 2010 Woman's Day magazine listed ten romances between people and things, including the Berlin Wall,  a fairground ride, a body pillow, a Nintendo video game character, a Volkswagen Beetle, the World Trade Center, a steam locomotive, an iBook and a metal processing system.
 A March 2012 segment of TLC's My Strange Addiction featured Nathaniel, a man emotionally and sexually attracted to his car. Nathaniel told Anderson Cooper that he was also attracted to jet skis and airplanes.
 In 2013 an Australian woman, Jodi Rose, married the Le Pont du Diable Bridge in France.
 In 2016 an American man was refused permission to marry his computer.
 In 2020, a Russian woman, Rain Gordon, married a briefcase.

Music 
 Big Boi's 2012 solo album, Vicious Lies and Dangerous Rumors, includes a song called "Objectum Sexuality."
 Keys N Krates's video for the song "Save Me," featuring Katy B, focuses on this particular sexuality.

Cinema
Jumbo (2020) tells the story of a cleaner (played by Noémie Merlant) at an amusement park who falls in love with a fairground ride. Zoé Wittock, the director, took her inspiration from the experience of Erika Eiffel (above).
Titane tells the story of a female serial killer (played by Agathe Rousselle) who somehow becomes pregnant after rubbing herself into a car.

Television
Australian Netflix series Lunatics (2019) features a character named Keith Dick (played by Chris Lilley), a fashion designer who falls for “Karen”, a Sharp XE-A203 cash register, as well as an old fashioned vacuum cleaner.
In the series SpongeBob SquarePants, Plankton is in love with Karen, a computer.

See also 
 Agalmatophilia, sexual attraction towards dolls, statues, mannequins or other objects which mimic the appearance of humans
 Animism, the belief that all things, both animate and inanimate, possess a spiritual essence
 Doll fetish 
 List of paraphilias
 Mechanophilia, a paraphilia involving sexual attraction towards machines, particularly vehicles
 Paraphilia
 Plushophilia 
 Sexual fetishism
 Shoe fetishism

References

External links 
 The OS Internationale website
 Interviews of Eija-Riitta Berliner-Mauer and Erika Eiffel
 Eija-Riitta Berliner-Mauers website

Paraphilias
Sexual fetishism